The 2021 Nigeria Women's Cup (known as the 2021 Aiteo Women's Cup for sponsorship reasons) was the 27th edition of the Nigeria Women's Cup, the main knockout tournament for women's football in Nigeria.

Bayelsa Queens won their first Aiteo Cup after defeating Robo Queens 4–2 at the final after they had lost the previous six finals they played in. This also marked the first and only time two clubs from the same state won the Aiteo cup at both the men and women's edition in the same season as Bayelsa United also won the men's edition.

Nasarawa Amazons were the defending champions but were eliminated by Robo Queens at the quarterfinals.

Format 
20 clubs from 19 states plus the FCT entered the tournament.

The first round involves the 8 lowest placed clubs, the winners then proceed to the second round where they join the remaining 12 clubs.

Matches are played 90 minutes, tied fixtures goes straight to a penalty shoot-out.

First round 
Eight clubs participated in this round. All matches were played on 4 July.

|}

Second round 
Sixteen clubs participated in this round, the four winners from the first round and the remaining 12 clubs. Matches were played on 8 July.

|}

Quarter-finals 
The eight winners from the second round were pitted against each other.

|-
|colspan=3|11 July 2021
|-

|-
|colspan=3|16 July 2021
|-

|}

Semi-finals 
Bayelsa Queens qualified for their seventh cup final (of which they had won none) as they inflicted on Rivers Angels their heaviest defeat in its club's history. Robo Queens also reached their first Aiteo cup final as they defeated Edo Queens on penalty-shootout.

|-
|colspan=3|18 July 2021
|-

|-
|colspan=3|19 July 2021
|-

|}

Final 
The final was played on 8 August at the Samuel Ogbemudia Stadium in Benin City. It was shown live before the men's final which was played later that day.

|}

Awards

References

2020–21 in Nigerian football
Women's cup